The 1979 French motorcycle Grand Prix was the last round of the 1979 Grand Prix motorcycle racing season. It took place on the weekend of 31 August–2 September 1979 at the Bugatti Circuit in Le Mans.

Classification

500 cc

References

French motorcycle Grand Prix
French
Motorcycle Grand Prix